Keith Donohue (born 1959) is an American novelist. He is the author of five novels: The Motion of Puppets (2016), The Boy Who Drew Monsters (2014), Centuries of June (2011), Angels of Destruction (2009), and The Stolen Child (2006). His acclaimed 2006 novel The Stolen Child, about a changeling, was inspired by the Yeats poem of the same name.

Background
Born and raised in Pittsburgh, Pennsylvania, he earned his B.A. and M.A. from Duquesne University and his Ph.D. in English from The Catholic University of America.

Until 1998 he worked at the National Endowment for the Arts and wrote speeches for chairmen John Frohnmayer and Jane Alexander, and is currently director of communications for the National Historical Publications and Records Commission, the grant-making arm of the US National Archives in Washington, DC.

He has also written book reviews for the Washington Post.

Works

References

Sources
Contemporary Authors Online. The Gale Group, 2007. PEN (Permanent Entry Number):  0000169243.

External links
Author website

Living people
1960 births
21st-century American novelists
Writers from Pittsburgh
Magic realism writers
Duquesne University alumni
Catholic University of America alumni
American male novelists
21st-century American male writers
Novelists from Pennsylvania